Legislative elections were held in El Salvador between 12 and 14 January 1932. The government had promised free and fair elections and invited all parties, including the Communist Party of El Salvador, to compete. However, voters had to be registered in their municipalities alongside their party, thus giving the government a list of Communist Party members. In the preceding municipal elections on 3–5 January, the Communists won several predominantly indigenous municipalities in the west of the country. However, the Maximiliano Hernández Martínez government cancelled the planned second round of the legislative and municipal elections due to the Communist success. The conservative Progressive Fraternal Party boycotted the elections in San Salvador on the grounds of electoral fraud.

References

Bibliography
Alvarenga Venutolo, Patricia. Cultura y etica de la violencia. San José: EDUCA. Based on her dissertation, Reshaping the ethics of power: a history of violence in El Salvador (1994). 1996.
Bland, Gary. "Assessing the transition to democracy." Tulchin, Joseph S. with Gary Bland, eds. 1992. Is there a transition to democracy in El Salvador? Boulder: Westview Press (Woodrow Wilson Center current studies on Latin America). 1992.
Grieb, Kenneth J. "The United States and the rise of General Maximiliano Hernández Martínez." Journal of Latin American studies 3, 2:151-172 (November 1971). 1971.
Larde y Larín, Jorge. Guía Histórica de El Salvador. San Salvador: Ministerio de Culture. 1958.
Political Handbook of the world, 1932. New York, 1933.
Vidal, Manuel. Nociones de historia de Centro América (especial para El Salvador). San Salvador: Ministerio de Educación. Ninth edition. 1970.

El Salvador
Legislative elections in El Salvador
1932 in El Salvador
Election and referendum articles with incomplete results